is a railway station on the Hokuriku Railroad Ishikawa Line in the city of Nonoichi, Ishikawa, Japan, operated by the private railway operator Hokuriku Railroad (Hokutetsu).

Lines

Station layout
The station consists of one side platform serving a single bi-directional track. The station is unattended.

Adjacent stations

History
Oshino Station opened on 22 June 1915.

Surrounding area
 Shibafune Koide headquarters
 
 Oshino Chuo Park
 Oshino Post Office

See also
 List of railway stations in Japan

References

External links

 Oshino Station information 

Railway stations in Ishikawa Prefecture
Railway stations in Japan opened in 1915
Hokuriku Railroad Ishikawa Line
Nonoichi, Ishikawa